Müngsten Bridge is the highest railway bridge in Germany. This stretch is part of the Wuppertal-Oberbarmen–Solingen railway. It is used exclusively by the Rhine-Ruhr S-Bahn line S 7. On 1 April 2013, the Müngsten Bridge was closed for extensive renovation work: it reopened on 27 July 2015, but a further lengthy closure for a comprehensive corrosion treatment is planned for 2018. During the works, the train from Solingen Hbf to Remscheid Hbf terminated at Solingen Mitte and a bus continued to Remscheid.

Originally the bridge was named Kaiser-Wilhelm-Brücke (Emperor Wilhelm Bridge) to honour Emperor Wilhelm I. After the end of the monarchy the bridge was renamed after the nearby settlement of Müngsten, which is close to the city limits of Solingen, Remscheid and Wuppertal. Today, the settlement no longer exists, so Müngsten is simply a landmark.

History

First drafts for a bridge connecting the two cities of Remscheid and Solingen go back as far as 1889. Preparatory work began in 1893, the bridge was finished in 1897.

A total of 5,000 tons (4,900 LT; 5,500 ST) of steel were used in its construction. 950,000 rivets hold the structure together. During construction, a number of advanced building techniques were used.

Anton von Rieppel (1852 – 31 January 1926), an architect and engineer, was in charge of the project. A memorial plaque at the foot of the bridge reminds one of his efforts.

Originally, the bridge was planned to be single-track. However, high future traffic growth projections led to the redesign as a dual-track bridge.

The Prussian Parliament approved the 5 million Marks required to build the bridge in 1890.

The first breaking of the earth was on 26 February 1894.

The bridge's official inauguration celebration took place on 15 July 1897. Emperor Wilhelm II did not attend the ceremony in person. Prince Friedrich Leopold of Prussia attended the festivities instead. Emperor Wilhelm II visited the bridge two years later, on 12 August 1899.

Myths, legends and anecdotes
The bridge was a masterpiece of Victorian-era engineering. For its time, it was a highly sophisticated structure. It astonished the local population, many of whom had had little exposure to such state-of-the-art engineering work.

Very quickly, urban legends began to spread.

Some of these unfounded “tall tales”, (which are sometimes repeated to this day), are:

 Allegedly, the last rivet fastened in the bridge was made of pure gold.
 Allegedly, due to computational errors made by von Rieppel, the architect, half of the bridge had to be demolished since the two simultaneously built halves did not fit together.
 Allegedly, von Rieppel threw himself off the bridge and died in the fall.

Of course, there is no truth in any of these stories. The bridge was constructed as planned; von Rieppel's complex calculations, (all carried out without the aid of computers or arithmetic aids), were correct – he died about 30 years later after an unrelated illness.

What might be true are rumours about Emperor Wilhelm II's boycott of the inauguration ceremony. According to legend, the Emperor was annoyed that such a state-of-art structure was named after his grandfather, Wilhelm I, not after himself. He therefore decided not to attend the celebrations in person.

What is true is that the bridge has attracted an unknown, but large number of suicides during its more than 100-year existence.

See also
 List of bridges in Germany

References

Bibliography

External links

 
 Müngsten Bridge on bridge-info.org
 
 Anton Rieppel: Die Thalbrücke bei Müngsten bahnhof-lette.de

Railway bridges in Germany
Buildings and structures in Remscheid
Buildings and structures in Solingen
Bridges completed in 1897
Truss arch bridges
Truss bridges
Transport in North Rhine-Westphalia
Wupper